"Kjører på" is a 2012 single by Norwegian band Madcon featuring Swedish rapper and reggae artist Timbuktu. It is taken from the Madcon album Contakt that was released on 21 June 2012 to coincide with the release of the album.

Music video
The music video directed by Frederic Esnault and Bold Productions film shows the Madcon duo Tshawe Baqwa and Yosef Wolde-Mariam singing and dancing with Timbuktu on top of small building structures with grand views of the city of Oslo in the background.

Chart performance

Release history

References

2012 singles
Norwegian-language songs
Madcon songs
2012 songs